The 2001 Houston Astros season was the 40th season for the Major League Baseball (MLB) franchise in Houston, Texas.

For the fourth time in five seasons, the Astros won the National League Central division title, having won 93 games, tied with the St. Louis Cardinals, by virtue of beating them in the final game of the year on October 7, winning the season series 9–7 (after the season had been stopped for ten days due to the September 11 attacks).. In addition to the win, Shane Reynolds became the seventh Astro to win 100 games and the first since Mike Scott in 1989.

Offseason
January 2, 2001: Charlie Hayes was signed as a free agent with the Houston Astros.
January 3, 2001: Kent Bottenfield was signed as a free agent with the Houston Astros.

Regular season
With a triple on May 7 against the Chicago Cubs, first baseman Jeff Bagwell achieved the 700th extra base hit of his career.

On June 8, the first interleague game between the Houston Astros and the Texas Rangers took place at The Ballpark at Arlington, part of a rivalry known as the Lone Star Series.  The Astros won the game by a score of 5-4. The team that would win the most games between the two in a season would be awarded the Silver Boot.

For the second time in his career, Bagwell reached seven runs batted in (RBI) in a game – the second time he tied the club record – against the Kansas City Royals on July 7.  Over four successive games from July 8–13, Bagwell homered and totaled five home runs in that span.

In a contest at Enron Field against the St. Louis Cardinals on July 18, Bagwell hit for the cycle.  He went 4-for-5 with a BB and five RBI as the Astros won, 17–11.  He was the NL Player of the Month that July after batting .333 with nine HR, breaking his own club record with 36 RBI in a month, exceeding 34 RBI in August 2000.

While hitting his 32nd HR on August 19, 2001, against Pittsburgh, Bagwell collected his 100th RBI.  It was the sixth consecutive season he reached at least 30 HR and 100 RBI, making him the eighth player in MLB history to achieve such a streak, and the only Houston player to do so.  Five days later, also against Pittsburgh, he scored his 100th run, joining Jimmie Foxx, Lou Gehrig, and Babe Ruth as the only players in MLB history with six consecutive seasons of 30 homers, 100 RBI and 100 runs scored.  On September 30 at Chicago, Bagwell walked for his 100th of the season, thus making him the only player in MLB history register six consecutive seasons of at least 30 HR, 100 RBI, 100 runs scored, and 100 walks.

On October 4, Barry Bonds hit his 70th home run of the season off Houston pitcher Wilfredo Rodríguez to tie Mark McGwire's single season home run record.

Standings

Record vs. opponents

Transactions
June 5, 2001: Kirk Saarloos was drafted by the Houston Astros in the 3rd round of the 2001 amateur draft. Player signed June 24, 2001.
July 9, 2001: Charlie Hayes was released by the Houston Astros.

Roster

Player stats

Batting

Starters by position
Note: Pos = Position; G = Games played; AB = At bats; H = Hits; Avg. = Batting average; HR = Home runs; RBI = Runs batted in

Other batters
Note: G = Games played; AB = At bats; H = Hits; Avg. = Batting average; HR = Home runs; RBI = Runs batted in

Pitching

Starting pitchers
Note: G = Games pitched; IP = Innings pitched; W = Wins; L = Losses; ERA = Earned run average; SO = Strikeouts

Other pitchers
Note: G = Games pitched; IP = Innings pitched; W = Wins; L = Losses; ERA = Earned run average; SO = Strikeouts

Relief pitchers
Note: G = Games pitched; W = Wins; L = Losses; SV = Saves; ERA = Earned run average; SO = Strikeouts

National League Divisional Playoffs

Houston Astros vs. Atlanta Braves
Atlanta wins the series, 3-0

Farm system

References

External links
2001 Houston Astros season at Baseball Reference

Houston Astros seasons
Houston Astros Season, 2001
National League Central champion seasons
2001 in sports in Texas